Muhammad Zakariya may refer to:

Muhammad ibn Zakariya al-Razi (born 865), Persian alchemist, chemist, physician, philosopher and scholar
Muhammad Zakariya al-Kandahlawi (born 1898), Indian Sunni Muslim scholar